Adrian Bajrami (born 5 April 2002) is a professional footballer who plays as a centre-back for Portuguese club Benfica B. Born in Switzerland, he plays for the Albania national team.

Career
Bajrami is a youth product of the academies of Langenthal, TOBE and Young Boys in Switzerland, before moving to Benfica's academy in 2018. On 29 October 2019, he signed his first professional contract with Benfica. He made his professional debut with Benfica in a 2–1 Liga Portugal 2 loss to Académico Viseu, coming on as a late sub in the 75th minute.

International career
Born in Switzerland, Bajrami is of Albanian origin from Ohrid. In 2019, he played for both the Switzerland U18s and the Albania U19s. He was called up to the senior Albania national team for a set of friendlies in May 2022. He debuted with the senior Albania national team in a friendly 0–0 tie with Estonia on 13 June 2022.

Career statistics

Club

Notes

Honours
Benfica
Under-20 Intercontinental Cup: 2022

References

External links

2002 births
Living people
People from Langenthal
Albanian footballers
Albania international footballers
Albania youth international footballers
Swiss men's footballers
Switzerland youth international footballers
Swiss people of Albanian descent
Association football defenders
Liga Portugal 2 players
S.L. Benfica B players
Sportspeople from the canton of Bern
Albanian expatriate footballers
Swiss expatriate footballers
Expatriate footballers in Portugal
Albanian expatriate sportspeople in Portugal
Swiss expatriate sportspeople in Portugal